Espen Lie Hansen (born 1 March 1989) is a Norwegian handball player who last played for Drammen HK and formerly the Norwegian national team.

He competed at the 2016 European Men's Handball Championship.

Gallery

References

External links

1989 births
Living people
Norwegian male handball players
Expatriate handball players
Norwegian expatriate sportspeople in Austria
Norwegian expatriate sportspeople in Denmark
Norwegian expatriate sportspeople in France
Norwegian expatriate sportspeople in Germany
Handball-Bundesliga players
Sportspeople from Drammen